Pilocrocis confixalis is a moth in the family Crambidae. It was described by Francis Walker in 1866. It is found in New Guinea and on the Sula Islands.

References

Pilocrocis
Moths described in 1866
Moths of New Guinea
Moths of Indonesia